BRL-44408 is a drug used in scientific research which acts as a selective antagonist for the α2A adrenoreceptor. It has been suggested as having potential therapeutic application in the treatment of extrapyramidal side effects produced by some antipsychotic medications.

References

External links

Alpha-2 blockers
Isoindolines
Imidazolines